Francis Warner (died 3 April 1667) was an English merchant and politician who sat in the House of Commons  in 1659.

Warner was a city of London merchant and  a member of the Worshipful Company of Leathersellers. On 25 February 1658, he was elected an alderman of the city of London for the Bridge ward. He was master of the Leathersellers Company for 1658 to 1659. In 1659, he was Sheriff of London, and was President of St. Thomas' Hospital from 1659 to 1660.

In 1659, Warner was elected Member of Parliament for Tiverton in the Third Protectorate Parliament.

References

Year of birth missing
1667 deaths
English MPs 1659
Merchants from London
High Sheriffs of Greater London
Politicians from London
17th-century merchants
17th-century English businesspeople